Buin Miandasht County is in Isfahan province, Iran. The capital of the county is the city of Buin Miandasht. At the 2006 census, the region's population (as Buin Miandasht District of Faridan County) was 27,586 in 6,666 households. The following census in 2011 counted 26,137 people in 7,532 households. At the 2016 census, the county's population was 24,163 in 8,026 households, by which time the district had been separated from the county to form Buin Miandasht County.

Administrative divisions

The population history and structural changes of Buin Miandasht County's administrative divisions over three consecutive censuses are shown in the following table. The latest census shows two districts, five rural districts, and two cities.

References

 

Counties of Isfahan Province